Bojan Zoranović (born 12 April 1990) is a Serbian football forward, playing for Serbian White Eagles in the Canadian Soccer League.

Club career

Early career 
Zoranović began his career in 2006 in the Serbian League West with FK Takovo. In 2007, he moved up to the Serbian First League with Metalac Gornji Milanovac. Metalac would secure promotion to the country's top-tier league in the 2008-09 season. The club re-signed him for the following season where he made his debut in the SuperLiga. His debut match was on August 14, 2010, against OFK Beograd. Though he managed to make his debut in the first division he spent the majority of his tenure with loan spells with Šumadija Aranđelovac and Metalac Trgovački.

Serbia 
He had another stint in the Serbian top tier in 2012 with Radnicki Kragujevac. In his debut season with Radnicki, he played 7 matches. After a season with Radnički, he returned to his former club Metalac Gornji Milanovac where he appeared in 8 matches.

After a brief stint in Bosnia, he returned to the Serbian second tier the following season to play with Mačva Šabac. In total, he appeared in 6 matches for the club.

Bosnia  
In the winter of 2014, he was transferred abroad to the Premier League of Bosnia and Herzegovina to play with Slavija Sarajevo. In 2015, he returned to Bosnia to play in the First League of the Republika Srpska with FK Leotar. He departed from Leotar in the 2016 January transfer window.

Return to Serbia 
Zoranović returned to the Serbian First League in 2016 to sign with FK Kolubara. His final season in Serbian football was with Dinamo Vranje for the 2016-17 season.

Canada 
In 2018, he played abroad for the second time in the Canadian Soccer League with CSC Mississauga. He split the 2018 season by also playing with Unionville Milliken. After a season in Mississauga, he signed with league rivals Scarborough SC for the 2019 CSL season. In his debut season with the eastern Toronto side, he helped the club clinch a playoff berth by finishing as runners-up in the first division. He participated in the  CSL Championship final where Scarborough successfully defeated FC Ukraine United. 

Zoranović signed with the Serbian White Eagles for the 2020 CSL season. The Serbs qualified for the postseason where they were eliminated in the first round by Vorkuta. He re-signed with Serbia for another season where once again the club secured a postseason berth but was eliminated in the opening round by his former club Scarborough.  

The 2022 season marked his third stint with the organization. He helped the Serbs in securing the regular-season title including a playoff berth. He also played in the second round of the postseason against FC Continentals where the White Eagles were eliminated.

Managerial career  
In 2022, he served as an assistant coach for the Serbian White Eagles under Uroš Stamatović.

Honours
Scarborough SC
CSL Championship: 2019

References

External links
 
 
 Bojan Zoranović at League1 Ontario
 Bojan Zoranović stats at utakmica.rs 

1990 births
Living people
People from Gornji Milanovac
Association football forwards
Serbian footballers
FK Metalac Gornji Milanovac players
FK Radnički 1923 players
FK Mačva Šabac players
FK Leotar players
FK Kolubara players
FK Dinamo Vranje players
FK Takovo players
FK Šumadija Aranđelovac players
Unionville Milliken SC players
Scarborough SC players
Serbian White Eagles FC players
Serbian White Eagles FC non-playing staff
Serbian League players
Serbian First League players
Serbian SuperLiga players
Canadian Soccer League (1998–present) players
League1 Ontario players
First League of the Republika Srpska players